Aššūr-bēl-nīšēšu, inscribed  mdaš-šur-EN-UN.MEŠ--šú, and meaning “(the god) Aššur (is) lord of his people,” was the ruler of Assyria  1417–1409 BC or 1407–1398 BC (short chronology), the variants due to uncertainties in the later chronology. He succeeded his father, Aššur-nērārī II, to the throne and is best known for his treaty with Kassite king Karaindaš.

Biography

As was the practice during this period of the Assyrian monarchy, he modestly titled himself “vice-regent”, or išši'ak Aššur, of the god Ashur. The Synchronistic Chronicle records his apparently amicable territorial treaty with Karaindaš, king of Babylon, and recounts that they “took an oath together concerning this very boundary.” His numerous clay cone inscriptions (line art for an example pictured) celebrate his re-facing of Puzur-Aššur III’s wall of the “New City” district of Assur.

Contemporary legal documents detail sales of land, houses, and slaves and payment in lead. The Assyrian credit system was fairly sophisticated, with loans issued for commodities such as barley and lead, interest coming due when repayment way delayed. The security posted for loans could include property, the person of the debtor or indeed his children.

There is a discrepancy in the data about his son and eventual successor. The Assyrian King List gives his immediate successor, Aššur-rā’im-nišēšu, as his son, but Aššur-rā’im-nišēšu's own contemporary inscription names his father as Aššur-nērārī II, suggesting that he may have been a brother of Aššūr-bēl-nīšēšu. The confusion is further compounded with the Khorsabad Kinglist and the SDAS Kinglist identifying Eriba-Adad I, who ascended the throne eighteen years later, as his son while the Nassouhi copy identifies him as the son of Aššur-rā’im-nišēšu.

Inscriptions

References

15th-century BC Assyrian kings
14th-century BC Assyrian kings
Year of birth unknown